Ab Niyeh may refer to:
 Ab Neyeh
 Ab Niyeh-ye Sofla